Bodorová is a village and municipality in Turčianske Teplice District in the Žilina Region of northern central Slovakia.

History
In historical records the village was first mentioned in 1265.

Geography
The municipality lies at an altitude of 465 metres and covers an area of 5.115 km2. It has a population of about 261 people.

Genealogical resources

The records for genealogical research are available at the state archive "Statny Archiv in Bytca, Slovakia"

 Roman Catholic church records (births/marriages/deaths): 1690-1896 (parish B)
 Lutheran church records (births/marriages/deaths): 1715-1895 (parish B)

See also
 List of municipalities and towns in Slovakia

References

External links
Surnames of living people in Bodorova

Villages and municipalities in Turčianske Teplice District